This is a list of Norwegian football transfers in the summer transfer window 2014 by club. Only clubs of the 2014 Norwegian Premier League are included. The window opened on 15 July and closed on 11 August 2014.

2014 Norwegian Premier League

Aalesund

In:

Out:

Bodø/Glimt

In:

Out:

Brann

In:

Out:

Haugesund

In:

Out:

Lillestrøm

In:

Out:

Molde

In:

Out:

Odd

In:

 

Out:

Rosenborg

In:

Out:

Sandnes Ulf

In:

 

Out:

Sarpsborg 08

In:

Out:

Sogndal

In:

Out:

Start

In:

Out:

Stabæk

In:

Out:

Strømsgodset

In:

 

 
 
 

Out:

Viking

In:

Out:

Vålerenga

In:

Out:

References

External links

Norway

2014

Transfers